Entraigues is the name or part of the name of several communes in France:

 Entraigues, in the Isère department
 Entraigues, in the Puy-de-Dôme department
 Entraigues-sur-la-Sorgue, in the Vaucluse department
 Antraigues-sur-Volane, in the Ardèche department
 Égliseneuve-d'Entraigues, in the Puy-de-Dôme department

See also
Antraigues (disambiguation)
Maria Entraigues-Abramson (fl. 1990s–2010), Argentine-American singer, actress, and longevity activist
Catherine Henriette de Balzac d'Entragues (1579–1633), mistress of Henry IV of France